Pegea is a genus of tunicates belonging to the family Salpidae.

The genus has almost cosmopolitan distribution.

Species:

Pegea bicaudata 
Pegea confoederata 
Pegea socia

References

Tunicates